Don Furner (26 December 1932 – 24 February 2020) was an Australian rugby league footballer and coach. As a player, he represented Queensland on nine occasions and also toured with the 1956–57 Kangaroos.

He began his coaching career as a player-coach with Junee in 1964.  In that year, the team won their first Group 9 grand final as well as the Maher Cup.  In 1965 he began coaching the Queanbeyan Blues, guiding that club to three successive Group 8 premierships (1965–67) and a further two Grand Finals (1968–69). He coached the Eastern Suburbs Roosters (1970–72), whom he took to the 1972 NSWRFL season's premiership final. He returned to the Queanbeyan Blues from 1973 to 1981, his team reaching the Grand Final in each of those nine seasons, including six premierships and a Clayton Cup win in 1974. Furner then became the first coach of the newly formed Canberra Raiders. Furner also coached the Canberra club to the 1987 NSWRL season's Grand Final. He later joined Parramatta for the 1985 NSWRL season. He was appointed the Australian national coach from 1986 to 1988.  He coached the NSW Country team and two now-defunct Group 20 clubs, Narrandera Lizards in 1998 and Yanco Wamoon Hawks in 2005. He took the latter to the 2005 group 20 grand final, which they lost to West Wyalong.

His sons are David Furner who used to be a player and coach of the Canberra Raiders and Don Furner, Jr. who became the Canberra Raiders' CEO. Furner died on 24 February 2020, aged 87.

References

External links
Queensland Representatives at qrl.com.au

 
  
 
 

1932 births
2020 deaths
Australia national rugby league team coaches
Australia national rugby league team players
Australian expatriate sportspeople in Fiji
Australian rugby league coaches
Australian rugby league players
Canberra Raiders coaches
Fiji national rugby league team coaches
Queensland rugby league team players
Sydney Roosters coaches